Isaac L. Auerbach (October 9, 1921 – December 24, 1992) was an early advocate and pioneer of computing technologies, holder of 15 patents, founding president of the International Federation for Information Processing (1960–1965), a member of the National Academy of Sciences, an executive at the Burroughs Corporation and a developer of first computers at Sperry Univac.

International Federation for Information Processing established Isaac L. Auerbach Award in his name.

Auerbach was elected as a Distinguished Fellow of the British Computer Society in 1975 for his pioneering work in computing technologies.  He graduated from Drexel University (BS) and Harvard University (MS).

References 

1921 births
1992 deaths
American electrical engineers
American computer scientists
Members of the United States National Academy of Sciences
Members of the United States National Academy of Engineering
International Federation for Information Processing
Place of birth missing
Burroughs Corporation people
Fellows of the British Computer Society
Drexel University alumni
Harvard University alumni